Rednald was a nobleman in the Kingdom of Hungary, who, according to a non-authentic charter, served as Judge royal in 1145, during the reign of Géza II of Hungary.

References

Sources
  Zsoldos, Attila (2011). Magyarország világi archontológiája, 1000–1301 ("Secular Archontology of Hungary, 1000–1301"). História, MTA Történettudományi Intézete. Budapest. 

Judges royal
12th-century Hungarian people